In mathematics, a twisted polynomial is a polynomial over a field of characteristic  in the variable  representing the Frobenius map . In contrast to normal polynomials, multiplication of these polynomials is not commutative, but satisfies the commutation rule 

for all  in the base field.

Over an infinite field, the twisted polynomial ring is isomorphic to the ring of additive polynomials, but where multiplication on the latter is given by composition rather than usual multiplication. However, it is often easier to compute in the twisted polynomial ring — this can be applied especially in the theory of Drinfeld modules.

Definition
Let  be a field of characteristic . Repeated application of this relation yields a formula for the multiplication of any two twisted polynomials.

As an example we perform such a multiplication

Properties
The morphism 

defines a ring homomorphism sending a twisted polynomial to an additive polynomial. Here, multiplication on the right hand side is given by composition of polynomials. For example 

using the fact that in characteristic  we have the Freshman's dream .

The homomorphism is clearly injective, but is surjective if and only if  is infinite.

Even though this ring is not commutative, it still possesses (left and right) division algorithms.

References

 

Algebraic number theory
Finite fields